Coaming is any vertical surface on a ship designed to deflect or prevent entry of water.  It usually consists of a raised section of deck plating around an opening, such as a cargo hatch. Coamings also provide a frame onto which to fit a hatch cover.

The protective metal sheeting or plating protecting against water entry into ventilation shafts in large ships is called a coaming as it suits this purpose. 

The term was borrowed by the aviation industry to refer to a low rim around the opening for an unenclosed cockpit. 

The origin of the term is unknown.

Coaming also refers to the raised structure around the cockpit of a kayak.

References

External links

 Code of Federal Regulations, Title 46

Watercraft components